William Francis Burns (June 23, 1932 – June 5, 2021) was an American Army major general who later served as the Director of the Arms Control and Disarmament Agency from 1988 to 1989 under President Ronald Reagan.

He graduated from La Salle University in 1954 and joined the Army from ROTC in that same year. Reaching the rank of major general, Burns' commands included Deputy Assistant Secretary of State for Arms Control, Bureau of Politico-Military Affairs, Joint Chiefs of Staff Representative to the Intermediate-range Nuclear Forces negotiations from 1981 to 1984 and 1985 to 1986 as well as deputy commandant of the United States Army War College. He retired in 1988, and died on June 5, 2021, in Carlisle, Pennsylvania.

His son, William J. Burns, was a career Foreign Service Officer who served as US Deputy Secretary of State and is currently serving as Director of the CIA in the Administration of President Joe Biden.

References

1932 births
2021 deaths
United States Army generals
La Salle University alumni
Princeton University alumni
People from Scranton, Pennsylvania
Burials at Arlington National Cemetery
Military personnel from Pennsylvania